Fullam is a surname, and may refer to:

 Bob Fullam (1897–1974), Irish footballer
 Everett L. Fullam (1930–2014), Episcopalian priest and scholar
 John P. Fullam (1921-2018), American judge 
 Johnny Fullam (1940–2015), Irish association footballer
 Patrick Fullam (1847–1924), Irish nationalist politician
 William Fullam (1855–1926), American naval officer